Opération Chammal is a French military operation in Iraq and Syria launched to help curtail the expansion of the Islamic State of Iraq and the Levant and to support the Iraqi Army. Its name comes from the Shamal (Chammal in French), a northwesterly wind that blows over Iraq and the Persian Gulf states.

Airstrikes over Iraq started 19 September 2014 and airstrikes over Syria started by the end of September 2015. The French operation was at first limited to airstrikes and French president François Hollande had stated that no ground troops would be deployed in the conflict. Additionally, the French frigate  joined the United States Navy's Commander Task Force 50 (CTF 50) as an escort.

On 14 November 2015, ISIS claimed that the terrorist attacks that took place in Paris the previous day were retaliation for Opération Chammal. In response, France decided to expand the scope of its operations against the Islamist group and more assets were deployed.

Background 

On 10 June 2014, the terrorist group of the Islamic State of Iraq and the Levant and several other Sunni insurgents took control of the second-most populous city of Iraq, Mosul. After fighting the Iraqi Army, ISIL seized cities and committed massacres and other atrocities.

ISIL committed mass murder and other atrocities against the Assyrians, as well as the Yazidis. ISIL also carried out the Camp Speicher massacre in June 2014, killing thousands of people. Until August, ISIL had controlled almost one-third of Iraq.

On 7 August 2014, U.S. President Barack Obama authorized airstrikes in Iraq. The next day, the U.S. Air Force launched airstrikes targeting the ISIS fighters, with humanitarian aid support from the United Kingdom and France. On 10 September 2014, Obama outlined plans to expand U.S. operations to Syria.

French authorities' statements leading up to France attacking ISIL 
In September 2014, the French president and his ministers alluded to possible French military action against ISIL:

	 

	  

The French government considered that international legitimacy was provided by 15 August 2014 resolution 2170 from the United Nations Security Council.

Air strikes on Iraq 
On 18 September 2014, the United States Secretary of State, John Kerry, announced in front of the United States House Committee on Foreign Affairs in the United States House of Representatives that President François Hollande had announced that he authorized airstrikes in Iraq, in response to a request by the Iraqi government. 

On 19 September, the French Air Force carried out their first airstrike using two Rafale jets armed with GBU-12 Paveway II bombs, beginning the French intervention. It conducted the airstrikes on an ISIS depot in Mosul, dropping 4 GBU-12 bombs. Hollande's office said that the ISIS depot that was targeted was hit and completely destroyed. The airstrikes killed 75 fighters from the Islamic State. A spokesman of the Iraqi military, Qassim al-Moussawi, stated that four French airstrikes had hit the town of Zumar, killing dozens of militants.

On 21 September, two Rafale jets provided air support for the Iraqi Army near Baghdad in a reconnaissance mission. A day after, France conducted another reconnaissance mission over Mosul with two Rafale jets. Another reconnaissance mission conducted on 23 September. On 24 September, two reconnaissance and dynamic targeting missions were conducted in Mosul and Baghdad, supporting the Iraqi forces.

On 25 September, while in a reconnaissance mission, two Rafale jets conducted France's second airstrike after the jets received information about targets near them by the Coordination air operation center, a day after the beheading of the French hostage, Hervé Gourdel, by the Jund al-Khilafah terrorist group in Algeria. Stéphane Le Foll said "This morning [France] carried out airstrikes on the territory of Iraq." The jets destroyed 4 warehouses of ISIL near Fallujah. French/American jets conducted airstrikes at night in Kirkuk, killing 15 ISIL fighters and injuring 30.

Two reconnaissance missions were conducted by two Rafale jets and an Atlantique 2 over Nineveh Governorate on 26 September.

In November 2014, the strike force was augmented with 6 Dassault Mirage 2000Ds based in Jordan.

Between 18 December 2014 and 7 January 2015, French aircraft performed 45 missions in total. Rafales and Mirages performed 30 of those missions neutralising ten targets.

On 14 January 2015, François Hollande declared that the aircraft carrier  would deploy to the Persian Gulf with its strike group and that it was capable of supporting airstrikes against ISIL. The ship was deployed in November and France launched its first airstrikes from the carrier on 23 November.

Air strikes on Syria and Iraq 
From the end of September 2015, France began airstrikes on ISIL in Syria as well, on a small scale to avoid inadvertently strengthening the hand of president Bashar Assad by hitting his enemies.

French aircraft hit targets in Syria in early October 2015. In November, French Prime Minister Manuel Valls told reporters in Amman, "Terrorist attacks have taken place (in France) ... In the name of self-defence it is obligatory to strike Daesh and we will continue," and "Whether there are French (citizens) among them, it's possible, but we have a responsibility to hit Daesh. Terrorists do not have passports."

On 14 November 2015, ISIL claimed that the 13 November 2015 Paris terrorist attacks were retaliation for Opération Chammal. In response, the French forces increased their attacks.
On 15 November 2015, the French Air Force launched its largest airstrike of the bombing campaign sending 12 planes, including 10 fighters, that dropped 20 bombs in training camps and ammunition facilities in Raqqa, Syria, the de facto capital of ISIL. The UK offered support with air-to-air refuelling and use of its Cyprus air base at RAF Akrotiri. Germany also intervened in response to the Paris attacks and assisted France by sending a frigate and Panavia Tornado reconnaissance aircraft to Turkey.

On 17 January 2019, French President Emmanuel Macron said that the Trump administration's planned withdrawal "should not deflect us from our strategic objective to eradicate Daesh" and vowed to keep French soldiers in Syria throughout 2019.

Battle of Mosul (2016)

France is part of the 60-nation strong international coalition supporting Iraqi and Kurdish forces to reclaim the city of Mosul, which fell to ISIL in 2014. The French army deployed four CAESAR howitzers and 150 to 200 soldiers at Qayyarah Airfield West, with 600 more French troops announced at the end of September. An additional 150 French soldiers were in Erbil, east of Mosul, training Peshmerga. At the end of September 2016, the Charles de Gaulle was deployed from Toulon to the Syrian coast to support the operation against ISIL through airstrikes and reconnaissance missions. France has 36 Rafale M jets in the mission, with 24 based on the Charles de Gaulle and 12 operating out of French Air Force bases in Jordan and the United Arab Emirates.

Operations in Libya
During February 2016, it was widely reported that French Special Forces were operating in Libya, alongside similar teams from the United Kingdom and the United States.

Military bases

In 2018, the Lafarge cement plant located south of Kobanî, Syria was being used as a base of operations by 1st Marine Infantry Parachute Regiment and United States Army forces.

During the operation, there were at least three bases near Kobanî, Sarrin and Ayn Issa. Moreover, French and American soldiers were reportedly spotted patrolling downtown Manbij, Syria.

Following the 2019 Turkish offensive into north-eastern Syria and U.S. withdrawal, the French military had to leave, given they rely on U.S. logistical support.

Casualties 
On 23 September 2017, an operator from the 13th Parachute Dragoon Regiment, Adjudant-chef Stéphane Grenier, became France's first soldier to be killed in combat during Operation Chammal. And on 21 March 2018, a legionnaire from the 2nd Foreign Infantry Regiment, Caporal Bogusz Pochylski, became the second soldier to lose his life.

Assets
Navy
Task Force 50 centered around the aircraft carrier  with 18 Dassault Rafale fighters, 8 Dassault-Breguet Super Étendard strike aircraft and 2 Northrop Grumman E-2C Hawkeye AEW&C aircraft
  
  
 
  Marne
 Between February and 17 April 2015.
 From 23 November 2015 to the present day.
  
 Between 20 October 2014 and 30 January 2015.
  
 26 November 2015 – present.

Air Force
BA104 Al Dhafra, United Arab Emirates
6 Dassault Rafale fighters
1 Dassault Atlantique 2 maritime patrol aircraft
1 Boeing C-135FR Stratotanker aerial refueling tanker
 Azraq Air Base – Jordan
3 Dassault Mirage 2000D fighters
3 Dassault Mirage 2000N fighters
1 Boeing E-3F Sentry AEW&C aircraft

See also
American-led intervention in Iraq
American-led intervention in Syria
Battle of Sinjar
Battle for Mosul Dam
Persecution of Yazidis by the Islamic State
International military intervention against ISIL
 Operation Okra – Australian operation against ISIL
 Operation Impact – Canadian operation against ISIL
 Operation Shader – UK operation against ISIL
 Operation Inherent Resolve – US operation against ISIL

References

2014 in France
2015 in France
2016 in France
2017 in France
2018 in France
2019 in France
2020 in France
2021 in France
2022 in France
Military operations involving France
Military operations of the War in Iraq (2013–2017) involving the Islamic State of Iraq and the Levant
Military operations of the Syrian civil war involving the Islamic State of Iraq and the Levant
Islamic State of Iraq and the Levant and France
French involvement in the Syrian civil war
French involvement in the War in Iraq (2013–2017)
November 2015 Paris attacks
François Hollande
Emmanuel Macron